Repton School is a 13–18 co-educational, private, boarding and day school in the English public school tradition, in Repton, Derbyshire, England.

Sir John Port of Etwall, on his death in 1557, left funds to create a grammar school which was then established at the Repton Priory. For its first 400 years, the school accepted only boys; girls were admitted from the 1970s, and the school was fully co-educational by the 1990s.

Notable alumni, also known as "Old Reptonians", include C. B. Fry, Jeremy Clarkson, Roald Dahl, Adrian Newey, and Michael Ramsey.

History 

The school was founded by a 1557 legacy in the will of Sir John Port of Etwall, leaving funds for a grammar school at Etwall or Repton, conditional on the students praying daily for the souls of his family.  The social mix of the early school was very broad. Among the first twenty-two names on the register of Repton there are five gentlemen, four husbandmen, nine yeomen, two websters, or weavers, a carpenter and a tanner. During the 17th century, the school educated the sons of Earl of Chesterfield and Earl of Ardglass, Samuel Shaw, and John Woodward, who was apprenticed as a linen draper before he took up medicine, eventually being appointed Gresham Professor of Physic.

Buildings at the site of Repton Priory were granted for the school in 1559 by Gilbert Thacker. Not long after this, relations between the school and the Thacker family began to deteriorate due to a conflict of interest in accessibility. In 1642, the school commenced an action against the Thacker family, and, in 1670, a wall was built to keep the two parties apart.

18th and 19th centuries 
Within the first hundred years, student body numbers rose to 200, but they had fallen by 1681 to twenty-eight boys. As the school was free until 1768, it is unclear how teaching was afforded, though the headmaster kept cattle in a room within the school around this period.  A pupil's letter home in 1728 relates to his father that the headmaster, George Fletcher, would withhold meals from the boys if they were unable to recite scripture.
 By the 1830s, some of the changes of reforming schoolmaster of Rugby School, Thomas Arnold, were being implemented at the school. A major effort was made, with the Charity Commissioners and the Clarendon Commission, to have the school accepted as one of the great public schools. However, Repton was excluded from the commission's 1864 report, thus excluding the school from the 1868 Public Schools Acts.

In the early centuries of the school's development, there was a pupil-conferred role called "Cock of the School" within the pupil body. A boy would be identified as the holder of this office after competing against likely candidates; once a boy was incumbent in this role, the younger boys deferred to him to do his work; writing in 1907, G. S. Messiter described the practice as an "ancient custom."

In 1874, local village children began attending the school, along with boarders. The headmaster at the time lamented the tension between local boys and boarders, stating that despite a sincere attempt to break down the barriers between them, he had had little success, and a substantial number of applications from "persons of good standing... and good fortune" had been withdrawn when told the boys were "of all classes down to the sons of blacksmiths and washerwomen". Due to this conflict, local village boys stopped attending Repton, which the headmaster at the time said was "mainly for the sake of the village boys... [to mitigate a] constant fear of their being ill-treated."

The first Committee of the Headmasters' Conference, appointed in December 1870, included the headmaster of Repton.

In 1884, a chapel was added to the school's buildings.

20th century 
Geoffrey Fisher became headmaster in 1914. Before going on to become Archbishop of Canterbury, Fisher was known for his tenure as headmaster being extremely intolerant. He expelled two senior boys after accusations of homosexuality arose within the student body.  Harold Abrahams, the Olympic champion in the 100m sprint in the 1924 Paris Olympics, joined the school in 1914. Recalling his time at the school, Abrahams said he encountered antisemitism from other students, often feeling bullied and alone.

In 1907, a gymnasium was added. This building is now grade II listed. In this decade, the chapel was enlarged, the Science Block, the Gymnasium, Armoury, Shooting Range and Swimming Bath were built, and the Priory 'Tithe' Barn turned into the Art School.

A reforming master, Victor Gollancz, established evening classes in political education for the boys in the early 1900s. At the time, the school considered that this tended to "undermin[e] the authority of the teachers by encouraging the pupils to ask questions." Gollancz was later dismissed from the school.

1,912 former pupils of the school served in the First World War, of whom 355 died in service. A war memorial was unveiled on major general Sir John Burnett-Stuart, director of military operations and intelligence, and dedicated by Edwyn Hoskyns, Bishop of Southwell on 1 November 1922.

In 1917, the writers Christopher Isherwood and Edward Upward began their time at Repton. They formed a friendship which continued when they both at Corpus Christi College, Cambridge. They revolted at school against everything associated with the establishment, which they called "the other side", and Upward reflected after leaving that "everyone was homosexual, up to a point, at Repton". In the 1920s, the poet Vernon Watkins was sent to Repton. His gentle character provoked regular bullying in his early years. When he died, the school claimed him as "perhaps the best poet Repton has had".

In 1924, George Gilbert Stocks, a director of music at the school, set the hymn Dear Lord and Father of Mankind to the tune Repton for use in the school's chapel. He took the melody from Hubert Parry's 1888 contralto aria "Long since in Egypt's plenteous land" in his oratorio Judith.

The writer Roald Dahl attended in the 1930s. His experiences are related in his semi-autobiographical book Boy, in which he describes his negative experience with physical altercations between students. He later stated that he "couldn't get over it" and has "never got over it." An account of a beating of boy called Micheal, in Roald Dahl's 1984 autobiographical book Boy, was attributed by Dahl to Fisher. But Dahl's biographer, Jeremy Treglown, has pointed out he was mistaken: the beating was in May 1933, a year after Fisher had left Repton, and the headmaster concerned was John Christie, Fisher's successor.  In his 1984 autobiography, Dahl states that when he was a young fag, he was instructed to warm toilet seats for older boys at the school.  He was also, along with other boys at the school, used as a product tester for Cadbury chocolate bars. Dahl claims that this was the inspiration for his book, Charlie and the Chocolate Factory.

Second World War and after 
The headmaster from 1937 to 1943 was H.G. Michael Clarke, who left the school to pursue an ecclesiastical career and became Provost of Birmingham Cathedral. He led the school during one of the most difficult periods of its history, when mounting debts and falling numbers, together with the effects of the war, led to questions as to the continuing viability of the institution; Clarke was obliged to close departments and two houses (The Cross and Latham). The school owed £50,000 (around £3.5 million at today's prices) and, in 1941, the Board of Education said its "future is doubtful".

The total number of pupils was 353 at the outbreak of war, which fell to 273 in 1943. To record these losses, a tablet extension to the war memorial was commissioned in 1948 and inaugurated in a ceremony lead on 10 July 1949, unveiled by lieutenant general Sir Charles Gairdner and dedicated by Geoffrey Fisher, Archbishop of Canterbury.

Numbers attending the school recovered in the late 1940s, such that The Cross was able to reopen in 1945 and Latham House in 1947. By 1957, the school was in better health: full with 470 pupils.

In the Second World War, 188 former members of the school died serving in the armed forces. Airmen were billeted in Mitre House during the war.

1957 saw the 400 year centenary of the school, celebrated with a royal visit from Queen Elizabeth II and Prince Philip, Duke of Edinburgh. A new chemistry block and workshops were added within the precinct, as well as extensive alterations to the science block. John Gammell took office as headmaster in 1968 and during his tenure girls began to be educated at Repton. It started with the arrival of two girls in 1970. By 1979, the first purpose-built girls' boarding house was opened.

Hazing is recorded as having taken place at Repton into the late 20th century. Jeremy Clarkson attended the school, later noting that he had suffered extreme hazing by other students, including being plunged into an ice pool and having his trousers cut in half. He was later expelled for "drinking, smoking and generally making a nuisance" of himself. He has stated that this conduct included doing car stunts on the sports pitches, smoking in the chapel, filling all the locks on the premises with Polyfilla, and attending lessons naked from the waist down.

In the 1980s, Chris Adams was at the school and subsequently observed, "The ingrained hierarchy whereby the older boys would subject the younger pupils to a lot of misery through the system of fagging. It was basically a system of slavery and I hated seeing the young lads literally trembling with fear".

In the early 1980s, the old Sanatorium was converted into a Music School. A fall in student numbers in the 1990s led to headmaster Graham Jones' decision to close two boys boarding houses (Brook House and The Hall) and reconfigure their occupants into a single new house, School House.

21st century 

The school marked its 450th anniversary in 2007 with a royal visit from Prince Edward, Earl of Wessex. Celebrations also included concerts featuring Michael Ball and Bryan Ferry.

In 2011, the 400 Hall theatre (originally built in 1957) was remodelled by Avery Associates Architects, following a £3.3 million upgrade. In 2013, a £9 million science block was built. During the preparations for the building work, archaeological digs were undertaken which indicated the site had been occupied in the Roman period.  Around this time, the old Squash Courts were made into a new gallery and textiles studio for the Art department.

The period 2015–2019 saw some rapid cycling of leadership of the school. Nevertheless, a new teaching block, the Lynam Thomas Building, in the precinct and a major refurbishment programme was being undertaken. In November 2019, Adam Peaty opened a newly redeveloped £6m sports centre at the school. Alastair Land was headmaster from 2016 to 2019 and was succeeded as headmaster by Mark Semmence. The building has since been nominated for Excellence in Design by the East Midlands Bricks Awards.

In September 2019, the school began using an AI service called AS Tracking in order to monitor students' mental health. The software was also used in 150 schools, tracking over 50,000 students' wellbeing. In November 2019, Libby Lane, Lord Bishop of Derby was appointed visitor of Repton School.

Co-curricular 

The school has a Combined Cadet Force and a music school, as well as various after-school clubs. All pupils are enrolled in CCF for one year; involvement thereafter is voluntary. Pupils can also choose to participate in the Duke of Edinburgh Award.

Sports 
The school competes in various sports. Main sports are: men's football, hockey and cricket; women's hockey, netball and tennis. Repton School has produced more than 150 first-class cricketers, 11 internationals, and three Test captains. Notable sporting former pupils include the 1932 Wimbledon tennis finalist, Bunny Austin, and several first-class cricketers. The Olympic gold medal and world record holder Adam Peaty used Repton's swimming pool as a training facility. His coach, Melanie Marshall, taught swimming at the school.

In 2013, six former pupils played together in an international hockey match.

In October 2018, Repton announced a complete £6 million renovation of the school's sporting facilities, including a new sports hall and a new strength and conditioning gymnasium. Repton's football team also won The 2018 ISFA Barry Burns Northern Eights Competition.

In January 2019, Repton announced Chris Read, former England cricketer, as the school's director of cricket.  In 2019, the first ever all-girls Lord's Taverners "Wicketz Festival", three days of celebration, education and cricket was held at the school. The U18 girls (outdoor), U16 girls (outdoor and indoor), U16 boys (outdoor), and U14 girls (outdoor) won national titles that same year.

In February 2020, Repton announced Scott Talbot, former Olympian and coach for the New Zealand and Australian national swim squads, as the school's director of swimming.

Fine arts 
Repton's art programme currently features two artists-in-residence: visual artist Louisa Chambers, and fine art media specialist Maria Georgoula.

Repton opened their 400 Hall theatre in 1957. In 2011, the theatre reopened after a £3.3 million renovation. A studio theatre was added in 2003 and the complex extended and fully refurbished in 2011 by architect Bryan Avery.

The school has been hosting a literary festival in October for some years. There is an annual Plowright lecture, with the 2020 lecture being on serial killers. One of the students won Ayn Rand Essay Competition prizes in consecutive years. In 2022, this event was branded "a flop", with organisers stating "audience for many of the speakers were woefully small...Everywhere was completely thin. It was such a shame".

The school's theatre was used for various performances during a time of closure of a theatre space in the Derby Guildhall, operated by the local authority in Derby.

Houses and pastoral arrangements 
Approximately 70 percent of pupils are boarders.

The school also has an on-site tuck shop called 'The Grubber'.

Fees and inspection 
In 2019/2020, fees were £36,783 for boarders and £27,207 for day pupils per year.

There are scholarships available for drama, sport, art, music, academic capacity and "all-rounder talent"; these do not exceed 20% of the school's fees. There is also some bursary assistance.

The school is inspected by the Independent Schools Inspectorate. An integrated inspection took place in March 2014, finding the school to be "exceptionally successful in achieving its aims... the quality of the pupils' achievements is excellent".

An emergency inspection in January 2015 was ordered by the Department for Education reviewing welfare and safeguarding compliance under the Independent School Standard Regulations (ISSRs) and the National Minimum Standards for Boarding (NMSB). The school failed to meet a number of the regulations, namely those dealing with pupil safeguarding; the promotion of good behaviour; suitability of staff and governance, leadership and management of the school.

A regulatory compliance inspection took place in 2018 which found that the school met all of the minimums and associated requirements. The subsequent integrated regulatory compliance and educational quality inspection in 2020 found that Repton met all regulatory compliance standards and was awarded the highest rating in each area.

The old priory 
Repton Priory was a 12th-century Augustinian foundation. It was dissolved in 1538. After dissolution, the Thacker family lived at the priory until 1553. One of this family, Gilbert Thacker, destroyed the church, almost entirely in a day; he did this during the time of Queen Mary, fearing the priory would be recommissioned as part of the Counter-Reformation.Only parts of the original buildings remained when the school was established. These comprised: the footings of areas of the priory remain in some areas, uncovered during construction work in 1922; the bases of a cluster of columns of the former chancel and chapels; fragments of an arch belonging to the former pulpitum, moved to their current position in 1906; fragments of the door surrounds of both the chapter house and warming room. and largest surviving portion of the priory known as "Prior Overton's Tower", which is post 1437; largely altered, it has been incorporated into a 19th-century building.

Affiliate schools 
The school set up Repton International Schools Ltd (RISL) in 2013 to establish, develop and maintain British international schools. The overseas schools are owned and funded by local investors, which can be education businesses, real estate corporates, private equity firms or wealthy philanthropists. They are licensed to use the Repton School "brand" and enter into a services agreement with RISL, which provides a full range of educational services and academic oversight. RISL remits its profits to Repton School Trust in the UK, which helps fund capital projects and bursaries. Repton has partnerships with John Port Spencer Academy, Etwall, and Repton Primary School.

The portfolio of overseas schools comprises:
Repton School Dubai (opened in September 2007), situated on a site in Nad al Sheba
 Repton School Abu Dhabi, which has two campuses on Al Reem Island, Abu Dhabi (2013 and 2017)
 Foremarke Dubai (2013), located in Al Barsha South and recently re-branded as Repton Al Barsha
 Repton International School (Malaysia) (2020)
 Chiway-Repton School, located in Xiamen, Fujian Province, PRC (2020)
 Repton Cairo will open as part of the Mivida development in New Cairo in September 2020
 Repton Doha will open in 2021, with Repton New Giza and Repton Sofia to follow in 2023

Preparatory school 
Repton has a junior school, named Repton Prep, which was founded in 1940.

In early 2020, it was announced that Repton School would be merging with Foremarke Hall School from September 2020 into a single school called Repton Prep. Shortly after, St Wystan's School joined the Repton group of schools.

Culture and cultural references 
Alexander Wilson, novelist, a spy and serial bigamist with four wives lied about being an alumnus of Repton School, which he was not; Fred Perry also lied about having attended Repton School, which he did not do either.

The "Stig" character in Top Gear is said to have been named after the school's pejorative slang term for new boys, a private reference with the producer Andy Wilman, who attended Repton with Clarkson.There is also a steam locomotive called "Repton" named after the school in 1934: Southern Rail, class V, Schools No 926, today based at the North Yorkshire Moors Railway.

The school's motto,  ("the gate is free from blame"), is a quotation from Ovid's .

The school has twice, in the 1930s and 1980s respectively, represented the fictional Brookfield School in a 1939 film and a 1984 BBC version of Goodbye, Mr. Chips. Around 200 pupils were extras in the 1939 film. Similarly, pupils appeared as extras in the 1984 BBC version.

Royal visits 
The school has had the following royal visits:

 The Queen and Prince Philip made an official visit to the school on 28 March 1957, to mark the 400 year anniversary of the school's establishment. The welcome was led by former headmaster Geoffrey Fisher and the Queen planted a mulberry tree.
 The Duchess of Kent visited the school in June 1985.
 The school received a visit from The Duke of Kent in September 2013.
 The school marked its 450th anniversary in 2007 with a royal visit from Prince Edward.

Headmasters 

 Thomas Whitehead (1621–1639)
 Philip Ward (1639–1642)
 William Ullock (1642–1667)
 Joseph Sedgwicke (1667–1672)
 Edward Letherland (1672–1681)
 John Doughty (1681–1705)
 Edward Abbot (1705–1714)
 Thomas Gawton (1714–1723)
 William Dudson (1723–1724)
 George Fletcher (1724–1741)
 William Asteley (1741–1767)
 William Prior (1767–1779)
 William Bagshaw Stevens (1779–1800)
 William Boultbee Sleath (1800–1830)
 John Heyrick Macaulay (1830–1840)
 Thomas Williamson Peile (1841–1854)
 Steuart Adolphus Pears (1854–1874)
 Henry Robert Huckin (1874–1882)
 William Furneaux (1883–1900)
 Hubert Burge (1900–1901)
 Lionel Ford (1901–1910)|
 William Temple (1910–1914)
 Geoffrey Fisher (1914–1932)
 John Christie (1932–1937)
 H.G. Michael Clarke (1937–1943)
 Theodore Lynam Thomas (1944–1961)
 John Thorn (1961–1968)
 John Gammell (1968–1978)
 David Jewell (1979–1987)
 Graham E. Jones (1987–2003)
 Robert Holroyd (2003–2014)
 Sarah Tennant, (acting head, 2014–2016)
 Alastair Land (2016–2019)
 Mark Semmence (from March 2019)

Controversies

Fee fixing and gender pay gap 
In September 2005, the school was one of fifty independent schools operating independent school fee-fixing, in breach of the Competition Act, 1998. All of the schools involved were ordered to abandon this practice, pay a nominal penalty of £10,000 each and to make ex-gratia payments totalling three million pounds into a trust designed to benefit pupils who attended the schools during the period in respect of which fee information had been shared. The Bursar at the time was Carl Bilson.

Female staff members were paid 56–57% less than their male coworkers at the school in 2018, and 50% less in 2019.

Incidents 
In 2014, Southern Derbyshire Magistrates' Court fined the school £10,000 following a guilty plea to a health and safety charge after an incident of negligence. In April 2019, a teacher tested positive for drink-driving after police saw his vehicle mount a kerb and then enter the school grounds. He was subsequently convicted and banned from driving for 20 months. Two months later a chemical spillage at the school's sports centre resulted in nine individuals needing precautionary treatment, as a result of a chlorine leak.

Sexual abuse 
The Charity Commission expressed "serious concerns" about safeguarding in 2018 after it received a sequence of serious incident reports from Repton School early in that year, specifically:

 In December 2014, a former head of physics, John Mitchell, was found to have abused a position of trust contrary to s.16(1)(a) of the Sexual Offences Act 2003 when he engaged in sexual activity with a female between the age of 13 and 17, not believing that she was 18 or over. He also communicated in a sexual way and with sexual motivations to this same pupil. He was disqualified from teaching indefinitely by the National College for Teaching and Leadership, following a finding that this was unacceptable professional conduct.
 In October 2017, a former pupil began proceedings against the school, claiming negligence on the school's part, in connection with an alleged rape of that pupil by another pupil in 2014. A 17-year-old pupil was arrested on suspicion of carrying out two rapes at the school; it was claimed that the school failed to supervise or discipline its pupil. The claimant made a request of the Derbyshire Constabulary for the papers from its investigation, which the police refused to provide without a court order.
 In 2018, four members of the school's staff were subject to police investigation for inappropriate sexual conduct towards children. In August 2018, one of these individuals, Jeremy Woodside, a 28-year-old former organist at the school, was placed on the Sex Offender's Register. The chronology of those issues emerging in early 2018 was as follows:
 On 29 January 2018, police arrested a member of staff on suspicion of attempting sexual contact with a child
 On 14 March 2018, a second police investigation into a staff member, relating to safeguarding concerns, was launched
 On 26 March 2018, allegations against a further two members of staff were reported
 In February 2022, a former teacher at the school, Simon Clague, pleaded guilty to multiple indictments for indecent assault and gross indecency with three pupils. All of the victims were under 16 at the time of the offending, which took place at the school in the 1990s; his trial was repeatedly delayed because of Covid-19.

Resignation of three governors over safeguarding 
In September 2022, 3 governors resigned en block over safeguarding issues at the school; these were new addition safeguarding issues to those set out above that came to light after the jailing of Simon Clague.

Criminal barrister of the Queen's Counsel Tim Hannam, Parliamentary Commissioner for Standards Kathryn Stone, and former Chief Constable of Nottinghamshire Susannah Fish (Order of the British Empire, Queen's Police Medal) were identified in press reports as the three governors who quit their roles. Ms Fish's resignation letter to the chairman of the governors, Mark Shires, said the decision to allow the teacher to remain in post means the school had not taken seriously:"an appalling catalogue [of alleged past misconduct and it was therefore the case that].... safeguarding of pupils past, present and future is now in jeopardy and lacks credibility’.

Notable alumni 

Alumni of Repton School are known as Old Reptonians.

They include:
 Harold Abrahams, Olympic gold medallist (100 m, Paris 1924)
 Bunny Austin, tennis player and Wimbledon finalist in 1932
 Jeremy Clarkson,  journalist and presenter
 Andy Wilman,        Executive Producer
 Brian Cook, later Sir Brian Batsford, graphic artist
 Roald Dahl, writer and children's author
 Blair Dunlop, musician
Henry Justice Ford, illustrator
 Sir Christopher Frayling, former Rector of the Royal College of Art
 C. B. Fry, sportsman and writer
 Graeme Garden, writer and performer
 Francis Habgood, Chief Constable of Thames Valley Police 2015-2019
 David Hodgkiss, cricket administrator
 Will Hughes, footballer
Richard Hutton, Donald Carr and Chris Adams, cricketers
 Christopher Isherwood, writer and activist
 Andrew Li, former Chief Justice of Hong Kong
 Shona McCallin, hockey player and Olympic gold medallist
 Adrian Newey, Formula One technical director
 Michael Ramsey, Archbishop of Canterbury 1961–1974
 Basil Rathbone, Nicholas Burns, George Rainsford and Tom Chambers, actors
 Georgie Twigg, hockey player and Olympic gold medallist
 Laurence Wyke, footballer

Notable former masters 
A number of headmasters of Repton went on to senior Church of England positions in the 20th century.

 William Furneaux was headmaster from 1882 to 1900, and, after retiring from Repton, he became Dean of Winchester.
 Lionel Ford was headmaster from 1901 to 1910, and he went on to be Dean of York.
 Hubert Burge was headmaster between 1900 and 1901, after leaving the school he would become Bishop of Oxford.
 William Temple was headmaster for four years from 1910 to 1914, and he went on to become Archbishop of Canterbury in 1942.
 Harry Vassall played international rugby for England, and was master of Repton School in 1925.

Coat of arms and flag 
The school's arms are three eaglets holding a "cross formy fitcy or".

Partnerships 

In May 2016, the school made defibrillators on its site available to the local community. Some of the staff at the school have been vocal about the issue of speeding traffic in the village of Repton and have participated in public speed gun enforcement.

During the 2020 Coronavirus pandemic the school's DT department made PPE for key NHS workers.

Repton School and Repton village combine every year for a charity event known as Sale of Work. Funds raised are distributed to a range of local and national charities chosen by representatives of both communities.

See also
Listed buildings in Repton

References

Notes

External links 

 
 Repton Preparatory School website
 Old Reptonian Society
 Repton Dubai website
 ISBI Information on Repton School

Boarding schools in Derbyshire
Private schools in Derbyshire

Member schools of the Headmasters' and Headmistresses' Conference
Schools cricket
Educational institutions established in the 1550s
1557 establishments in England